Nematopus is a genus of true bugs belonging to the family Coreidae.

The species of this genus are found in Central and Southern America.

Species:
 Nematopus aeneicrus Stål, 1865 
 Nematopus amazonus Stål, 1865

References

Coreidae